Stephen Douglas Sklenka is a United States Marine Corps lieutenant general who has served as the deputy commander of the United States Indo-Pacific Command since August 16, 2021. He previously served as the Director of Strategic Planning and Policy of the United States Indo-Pacific Command from July 2019. Previously, he was the Commanding General of the 1st Marine Logistics Group.

Sklenka is a 1988 graduate of the United States Naval Academy with a Bachelor of Science degree in history. He later earned a Master of Arts degree in national security and strategic studies from the Naval War College and a second Master of Arts degree in unconventional warfare/special operations low intensity conflict from the American Military University.

In June 2021, Sklenka was nominated for promotion to lieutenant general and assignment as deputy commander of the United States Indo-Pacific Command, succeeding Michael Minihan.

References

|-

Living people
Naval War College alumni
Place of birth missing (living people)
Recipients of the Defense Superior Service Medal
Recipients of the Legion of Merit
United States Marine Corps generals
United States Marine Corps personnel of the Gulf War
United States Marine Corps personnel of the Iraq War
United States Marine Corps personnel of the War in Afghanistan (2001–2021)
United States Naval Academy alumni
Year of birth missing (living people)